Ibn Zohr University is a public university in Agadir, Morocco.

History 
Created in 1989, the university takes its name from the Andalusian scholar Ibn Zhor el-Iyadi known as Avenzoar.

Education 
The university offers courses in the major disciplines of Science and Technology, Law and Economics, Letter and Human Sciences. It has nine faculties and six schools.The 163 courses are structured according to the LMD Higher Education Architecture - License, Master and PhD.

Research 
The university has several doctorales programs, research institutes, PhD students and researchers in the following research programs:
 Territory Planning, Societies, Migration and Sustainable Development
 Fundamental and Applied Chemistry
 Public Law and Private Law
 Economics and Management
 Anthropized areas: environmental risks and socio-economic fragility
 Geosciences and Geo-environment
 Regional History of Southern Morocco
 Languages and Communication
 Mathematics, Computer Science and Applications
 Heritage and development
 Life Sciences and Natural Resources
 Management Science and Technology
 Engineering Science and Technology
 Science, Technology and Engineering
 النص والخطاب
 العلوم القانونية والسياسية
 المذهب المالكي و التشريع المعاصر

Organization 
The number of students is over 120,000 (as of 2017–2018) spread over 17 institutions, namely:
 Faculty of Science - Agadir (FSA)
 Faculty of Legal, Economic and Social Sciences - Agadir (FSJES)
 Faculty of Legal, Economic and Social Sciences - Ait Melloul (FSJESAM)
 Faculty of Arts and Humanities - Agadir (FLSHA)
Faculty of Languages, Arts and Humanities - Ait Melloul (FLASH)
Faculty of Applied Sciences - Ait Melloul (FSAA)
 Faculty of Medicine and Pharmacy - Agadir (FMPA)
 National School of Commerce and Management - Agadir (ENCG)
 National School of Commerce and Management - Dakhla (ENCG)
 National School of Applied Sciences - Agadir (ENSA)
 Multidisciplinary Faculty - Ouarzazate (FPO)
 Multidisciplinary Faculty - Taroudannt (FPT)
 Faculty of Sharia - Ait Melloul
 Faculty of Sharia - Smara
 Graduate School of Technology - Agadir (ESTA)
 Higher School of Technology - Guelmim (ESTG)
 Higher School of Technology - Laayoune (ESTL)

References

External links 
Official website 

Universities in Morocco
Agadir
Educational institutions established in 1989
1989 establishments in Morocco
20th-century architecture in Morocco